The 1954 Green Bay Packers season was their 36th season overall and their 34th season in the National Football League. The team finished with a 4–8 record under new head coach Lisle Blackbourn and finished fifth in the Western Conference.

In a season of streaks, the Packers lost their first three games, all at home, climbed back to .500 at 4–4, then lost their final four.

Offseason

NFL draft 

 Yellow indicates a future Pro Bowl selection

Regular season

Schedule

Standings

Roster

Awards, records, and honors

References 

 Sportsencyclopedia.com

Green Bay Packers seasons
Green Bay Packers
Green